Alessandro Farina (born 20 February 1979, in Olbia) is an Italian football defender who currently plays for S.S. Cavese 1919.

Appearances on Italian Series 

Serie C1 : 147 Apps, 1 Goal

Serie C2 : 58 Apps, 1 Goal

Serie D : 93 Apps

Total : 298 Apps, 2 Goals

External links
http://aic.football.it/scheda/7730/farina-alessandro.htm

Living people
1979 births
Italian footballers
Association football defenders
Footballers from Sardinia
Olbia Calcio 1905 players
Cavese 1919 players
U.S. Grosseto 1912 players
S.S.D. Acireale Calcio 1946 players
Latina Calcio 1932 players
Fermana F.C. players